Eena Meena Deeka is a 1994 Indian comedy film directed by David Dhawan and produced by Nitin Manmohan. It stars Vinod Khanna, Rishi Kapoor and Juhi Chawla. Its plotline is loosely inspired by the 1989 movie Three Fugitives.

Plot
Deeka has been in jail for several crimes, including bank robberies. When his prison sentence is over, he decides to go straight. Unfortunately, while in a bank, he becomes a victim of a bungling bank robber, Inder or Eena, who needs money to get medical treatment for his mother. When the police arrive, they witness Eena with the notorious bank robber, and come to the conclusion that Deeka has gone back to his criminal ways. His attempts to convince them are in vain, and he must escape together with Eena for now, and he does so. The police are after Deeka, and he must get Eena to confess to the crime, and therefore clear his name. Eena is unwilling to confess, and runs away from Deeka. Deeka kidnaps DCP Ujwal Raja Bully's daughter, Meena. Later Eena and Meena fall in love. It is revealed that Deeka is Eena's long-lost brother who had been kidnapped in childhood by Bhujang, a criminal who wants his son Shani to marry Meena. In the end, Bhujand and his sons are arrested, Deeka reunites with his family and Eena and Meena get married.

Cast

 Vinod Khanna as Deeka
 Rishi Kapoor as Inder 'Eena'
 Juhi Chawla as Meena
 Anupam Kher as Ujjwal Raja Bully
 Kader Khan as Dabba - Beggar
 Shakti Kapoor as Kali - Beggar
 Kiran Kumar as Bhujang
 Gulshan Grover as Sunny - Bhujang's Son
 Mohnish Bahl as Mangal
 Alok Nath as Kashi
 Anjana Mumtaz as Raju's Mother
 Shiva Rindani as Bhujang's Son
 Lalit Mohan Tiwari as Bhujang's son
 Arun Bakshi as Batli - Beggar with Harmonium
 Dina Pathak as Eena's mother
 Javed Khan as Eena's Neighbour
 Piyush Mittal as Pandey Inspector
Tiku Talsania as Gabbar,Security Guard (At beginning of movie)
Rajendra Nath as Cashier in Bank (Guest Role)
Yunus Parvez as Hotel Owner
Anjana Mumtaz as a mad women who considers Eena as her own son
Alok Nath as Villager
Dinesh Hingoo as Baapji,Villager
Guddi Maruti as Villager

Soundtrack
Lyrics by Sameer and music by Anand–Milind.

References

External links

1990s Hindi-language films
1994 films
Films scored by Anand–Milind
Films directed by David Dhawan
Cross-dressing in Indian films